Mahni Khera is a village in North India's state of Punjab, in Sri Muktsar Sahib district. The majority of the residents are Sikh and of a variety of castes.

Etymology 
Mahni Khera was named after the Muslim leader of the village, Muhammad Mahni Khan.

Partition
After the partition of Pakistan and India in 1947, Muslims left the village. Muslims were evidently not persecuted there at the time, but nearby villages were attacked, and Muslims left the village in response.

Surnames
People of different surnames live there; the main surnames are  Sekhon, Gill, Hari, Brar, Sandhu,Punia and Sidhu. The majority of the people of Mahnikhera are Jatt and Sikh, as well as the people who migrated from Pakistan during the partition of 1947. Many of the residents of Mahni Khera had to leave their village in 1947, but they still live in the hearts of old villagers.

Demographics 
According to the 1991 census, the total population of the village was 1,648.

Economy 
The village has the Ambu Ki Chaki flour mill. The quality of the "Atta" (wheat flour) is exceptional.

Notables
Punjwood actor Gugu Gill is a resident.
Dr. Terwinder Singh Brar Msc. Agronomy Field officer in Swal Croporation ltd. Research Paper on Green Gram (Moong)
Sukhcharn Singh Sekhon Food and Supplies Inspector (Retd.) Belongs to Village Mahni Khera.
 Late Mohan Singh (Retd.) Lecturer in English also belong to village Mahni Khera 
 Kuljeet Kaur Brar a.k.a. Kuljeet Sekhon  (Bavly) – is a Ph.D. scholar - assistant Professor in Education at Punjab University Chandigarh  and author of Punjabi poetry. 
 Advocate Kulbir Sekhon (Senior advocate at Pb & Hr high court) is born at Mahni Khera.
Gugu Gill aka Guggu Gill – Punjabi film actor in movies such as Jatt Jeona Morh.

Location
Mahni Khera is located 18 km from Malout and 48 km from Sri Muktsar Sahib city.  It is located in development block Lambi. Nearby villages are Sham Khera, Bhai ka Kera, Baloch Kera, Burj Sidhwan, Bahadhur Khera, Gaddandob, Ratta Kheraand Sitogunno.

Gurudwara
The village has one newly built Gurudwara sahib.  The earlier Gurdwara sahib was in an old mosque. After partition no Muslim family remained, so the facility was converted. A panj peer is near this village.

Education 
The village has one middle school "Govt middle school, Mahni Khera".  The closest senior secondary school is in Sham Khera.  One private school is available.

Popular culture 
Punjabi films Putt Jattan De, Gabhroo Punjab Da and Chhohra Haryanae KA, were made in Mahni Khera.

References

External links 
 Muktsar

Sri Muktsar Sahib
Villages in Sri Muktsar Sahib district